Lavanya is an Indian feminine given name of Sanskrit origin in use in India, Bangladesh, parts of Pakistan and Nepal. Notable people with this name include the following:

Lavanya (actress) (born 1979), Indian actress
Lavanya Bhardwaj (born 1984), Indian actor and model
Lavanya Nalli, Indian businesswoman
Lavanya Rajamani (born 1973), Indian lawyer, author and professor
Lavanya Sundararaman, Indian singer
Lavanya Tripathi (born 1990), Indian model, actress and dancer

See also

LaTanya, given name
Lavanda (disambiguation)

Notes